Numinous is an English adjective and noun, taken from the Latin numen, “divinity.” But where numen refers to an objective divine being, numinous as an adjective refers to a subjective state. Numinous the noun refers to that which stimulates the subjective state. For example, a numinous grotto is distinct from the numen of the grotto. Numinous is used in the following contexts:

Interface with divinity
 Numinous, inner perception of the interface with God especially as described by Rudolph Otto
 Numinous, a topic of comparative religion
 Numinous, a word used of religious experience
 Numinous, a translation of a word used in some of the titles of the Jade Books in Heaven, scriptures of the Taoist Canon
 Numinous presence, xian ling in Chinese traditional religion
 Experience of the numinous, a feature of  Chinese salvationist religions

Philosophy
 Numinous legitimacy, political legitimacy of a state based on divine ordination
 Numinous Way, the current self-named philosophy of  David Myatt, ex-neo-nazi and ex-Islamic-convert
 Numinous, a property of all minds in the Korean Zen philosophy of Jinul
 School of the Numinous Treasure, another name for the Chinese Lingbao School
 Numinous presence in nature, a belief of  Finnish neopaganism
 Numinous quality, a characteristic of Jung’s collective unconscious

Numinous contexts
 Numinous, the feeling evoked by horror fiction
 Numinous, the feeling evoked by anasyrma
 Numinous, the feeling evoked by chanting a mantra
 Numinous, the feeling evoked by a grotto
 Numinous, the feeling evoked by the festival of Skira at ancient Athens
 Numinous, said of the mystical wu-practice of  Chinese shamanism in the Shang Period

Numinous objects
 Numinous mushroom, folk name for the lingzhi mushroom 
 Numinous, the power attributed to Arch Rock by Native Americans
 Numinous, an evil power attributed to Devil's Kitchen by Native Americans
 Numinous presence considered to be in a water spring

Roman numina
 Rumina, goddess of breastfeeding
 Auctoritas, the numen of authority

Other numina
 Numinous, a power ascribed to Teotl

Other uses
 Numinous, the fictional experiences of teen-agers in Mondo and Other Stories by J. M. G. Le Clézio
 Numinous Negro, a term coined by Richard Brookhiser based on the previous term Magical Negro
 Numinous communal experiences, a topic of study of  Roger D. Nelson
 Numinous Pivot, a translation of the Lingshu Jing, a Chinese medical text

See also
 Numen (disambiguation)
 Noumenon (disambiguation)